2021 Czech Lion Awards ceremony was held on 5 March 2022.

Categories
Nominations were announced on 17 January 2022 with Occupation and Zátopek receiving highest number of nominations.

Non-statutory Awards

References

2021 film awards
Czech Lion Awards ceremonies